Qatar National Day is a national commemoration of Qatar's unification in 1878. It is celebrated annually on 18 December. The holiday was established by a 21 June 2007 decree of the then Crown Prince and Heir Apparent Sheikh Tamim bin Hamad Al Thani. It is also known as Founder's Day.

Observance

The holiday is annually celebrated on 18 December. It is a national holiday and most of the public are given the day off from school and work. Prior to the Emiri decree in June 2007, Qatar National Day was annually celebrated on 3 September, the day of Qatar's independence.

Activities
Several activities are organized during the week of observance. These include:
Fireworks show: Includes music, lights and fireworks.
Katara National Day celebrations: Festivities and over 20 heritage-themed events are held at Katara Cultural Village.
National Day parade: Members of the general public parade through the Doha Corniche. Officials from the Armed forces, ISF, Ministry of Interior, and Amiri Guard also participate in the parade.
Classic car show: Antique cars formerly owned by government officials are showcased.

The 2022 FIFA World Cup Final took place on 18 December 2022.

Purpose and significance

On 18 December 1878, Jassim bin Mohammed Al Thani succeeded his father, Mohammed bin Thani as ruler of the Qatari Peninsula. He is deemed to have unified all the local tribes by combating external forces, such as the British. He also earned a considerable degree of autonomy for the tribes of the peninsula.

The holiday has been instrumental in developing a sense of national identity among locals and expats. It has also helped improve knowledge and appreciation of Qatar's heritage.

Online criticism of Qatari youth
Considerable internet controversy was generated in the country in 2009 after an expatriate professor who attended a parade posted her reaction on the online forum. In a thread entitled 'Shame on Qatar on Qatar National Day', she criticized the antics of Qatari youth, who routinely engage in activities such as driving on two wheels and wearing shocking masks during celebrations. This triggered a national dialogue over the rights of the population to criticize the country. The debate gradually increased in popularity and drew hundreds of participants from all sections of the community.

2016 cancellation
Following the December 2016 end of the Battle of Aleppo in the Syrian Civil War, the government on 18 December announced it would cancel all festivities in solidarity with the people of the city of Aleppo.

Gallery

References

External links

Official website
Qatar National Day
Qatar National Day

2007 establishments in Qatar
Recurring events established in 2007
National days
December observances
Public holidays in Qatar
Winter events in Qatar